The Bullwaddy Conservation Reserve is a protected area approximately  north east of Elliott in the Northern Territory of Australia. 

Amungee Mungee cattle station surrounds the Reserve to the north, south and west. Tanumbirini Station abuts the Reserve to the east. The Reserve is found on the Sturt Plateau and the Carpentaria Highway bounds the property to the north.

The Sturt Plateau has infertile, shallow soils on a lateritic land surface. The area supports large stands of Bullwaddy interspersed with dominant area of lancewood. 

The traditional owners of the area are the Alawa and Jingili peoples. The first Europeans to arrive in the area were pastoralists who brought cattle to the surrounding plains.

Near threatened animals that are found in the area include Bush stone-curlew, Spectacled hare-wallaby and Northern nailtail wallaby. Other species of interest include Black tailed goanna and the Giant frog.

See also
Protected areas of the Northern Territory

References

Conservation reserves in the Northern Territory
2000 establishments in Australia
Protected areas established in 2000